Pixbo is a locality in Västergötland, Sweden. Most of it lies within Härryda Municipality, except for a minor part which belongs to Mölndal Municipality. The urban area to which it belongs is Mölnlycke.

The locality is known through Pixbo Wallenstam IBK.

Populated places in Västra Götaland County